Viola Gentry (1894 - 1988) was an American aviator, best known for setting the first non-refueling endurance record for women.

Early life
Gentry was born in Gentry, Rockingham County, North Carolina. She learned to fly an airplane in 1924, which made her the first woman from North Carolina to fly an aircraft.

December 1928 attempt
On December 20, 1928, Gentry flew 8 hours, 6 six minutes and 37 seconds, which set the first non-refueling endurance record for women. This record was broken in 1929 when Bobbi Trout flew from California for 12 hours straight. After Smith's flight, Fédération Aéronautique Internationale (FAI) rules were regulated stating that endurance records had to be broken by a full hour.

July 1929 attempt 
In the attempt to reclaim the endurance record from Trout, Gentry tried another endurance flight which set out on July 27, 1929. Her aircraft, "The Answer", crashed in a field in Old Westbury, killing her co-pilot Jack Ashcraft.  Gentry survived the crash with a fractured skull and crushed shoulders, and was rushed to a hospital in Mineola, where she spent more than six months recovering.

Upon discharge from hospital in Mineola, Gentry took up residence with friends in Freeport.  She was unsuccessful in obtaining further work as an endurance pilot although she did return to flying, albeit as a passenger.

December 1933 attempt
In 1931, Gentry quit professional flying and returned to her previous job as a cashier at a North Carolina restaurant. Despite the change of career, she continued in her attempts to set flying endurance records.  On December 10, 1933, Gentry took off from Miami, Florida, in a new attempt to beat the record, supported by co-pilot Frances Marsalis and a refueling ship manned by Jack Loesing and Fred Fetterman.  Gentry intended to remain aloft for ten days and thereby beat the then-current record of eight days, four hours and six minutes, set by Marsalis and Thaden at Valley Stream.

Later life
Gentry continued throughout her life to advocate aviation, promoting it among young women and men. In 1934, Gentry and her husband filed for bankruptcy listing their assets as zero. In 1954, Viola Gentry received the Lady Hay Drummond-Hay Air Trophy in recognition of her efforts on behalf of women in aviation. Gentry was a long time friend of the aviator Amelia Earhart, both of whom tried to help common friend Irene Craigmile Bolam find happiness by the means of introducing her to aviation.

References

Aviators from North Carolina
Aviation pioneers
Flight endurance record holders
American aviation record holders
1894 births
1988 deaths
American women aviation record holders
20th-century American women